Dittersdorf is a municipality in the district Saale-Orla-Kreis, in Thuringia, Germany. On 1 December 2010 it absorbed the former municipality Dragensdorf.

References

Municipalities in Thuringia
Saale-Orla-Kreis
Principality of Reuss-Gera